= Emil Niță =

Romanian politician

Emil Niță (born 15 January 1956) is a Romanian politician who is currently a member of the Chamber of Deputies of Romania.

He was the Prefect of Brașov County between 1 October 2008 and 11 February 2009. In 2012, he was elected a member of the Chamber of Deputies on the Social-Democratic Party ticket.
